Mary L. G. Carus-Wilson (Petrie; after marriage, Mrs. Ashley Carus-Wilson, or Mary Carus-Wilson, or Mrs. C. (Charles) Ashley Wilson; pen names, C. Ashley Carus-Wilson and Helen Macdowall; 1861 – November 19, 1935), was an English author and speaker known for her work on biblical study and missionary work. Her father was Martin Petrie. She wrote a biography about her sister, Irene Petrie, a missionary to Kashmir. The Pitts Theology Library at Emory University has a collection of her papers. Eleanora Carus-Wilson was her daughter. She was also published using the name Helen Macdowall in the Sunday at Home and lectured on women's suffrage. In England she established a correspondence program for the secular study of scripture.

Early life
Mary Louisa Georgina Petrie was born in Yorktown, Surrey, England, the eldest daughter of Colonel Martin Petrie and his wife Eleanora Grant Macdowall Petrie. She graduated from University College, London, with a B.A. in 1881.

Career
Petrie founded, edited, and was president of The College by Post, a program for secular biblical study via correspondence created in the late 19th century.

She had articles published in various Christian and women's publications. She wrote nine books about missionaries and Bible study. She was also a speaker.

Her book Clews to the Holy Writ, promoted studying the Bible in its historical order.  She wrote Irene Petrie: Missionary to Kashmir of her sister who died doing missionary work in India.

She married Charles Ashley Carus-Wilson, a professor in Montreal, Canada, in 1892, and they had three children. After her marriage, she published under the name C. Ashley Carus-Wilson except in The Sunday at Home where she went by Helen Macdowall, her mother's family name. Her children were named Louis, Martin, and Eleanora (Eleanora Carus-Wilson). She died November 19, 1935 leaving to her two surviving children the home in Kensington that she inherited from her father.

Alfred Tucker corresponded with her September 20, 1903. She planned to write a biography about him.

She left her freehold to her daughter Eleanora.

She also wrote on the medical education of women.

Bibliography
 Clews to Holy writ; or, The chronological Scripture cycle; scheme for studying the whole Bible in its historical order during three years  (1892) and London : Hodder and Stoughton, 1894)
 Tokiwa and Other Poems by Mary Louisa Georgina Petrie Carus-Wilson (1895)
 Unseal the book : practical words for plain readers of Holy Scripture (1899)
 Irene Petrie, Missionary to Kashmir (1901) by Mary Louisa Georgina Petrie Carus-Wilson, Hodder and Stoughton
 The expansion of Christendom: a study in religious history
 Unseal the book: practical words for plain readers of Holy Scripture
 Saint Paul: missionary to the nations: a scheme for the study of his life and writings (1905)
 Redemptor Mundi. A scheme for the missionary study of the four Gospels (1907)
 A Tabular Scheme for reading the Bible chronologically, according to "Clews to Holy Writ" by Mrs. Carus-Wilson. Moore & Edwards, Uppermill (1909)
 S. Peter and S. John, first missionaries of the Gospel: a scheme for the study of the earliest Christian age
 Ben and his mother, published by Thomas Nelson and Sons (juvenile fiction)
 Baghdad [With illustrations and a map], London, (1918)

Papers and articles
Serving one another (1893)
 The medical education of women : a lecture (1895)
 Best Methods of promoting Temperance (1901), a paper she presented at the annual Women's Union conference.
 Debt of the Home to the Book, article

References

1861 births
1935 deaths
19th-century English women
19th-century English people
20th-century British women writers
19th-century British women writers
19th-century British writers
19th-century British biblical scholars
Women biographers
English biographers
19th-century British non-fiction writers
People from Surrey
Alumni of University College London
Female biblical scholars
20th-century pseudonymous writers
Pseudonymous women writers